Jort van der Sande (born 25 January 1996) is a Dutch professional footballer who plays as a forward for Eerste Divisie club NAC Breda.

Club career

FC Den Bosch
Van der Sande joined the youth academy of FC Den Bosch at age 10. He made his professional debut in the Eerste Divisie for the club on 15 August 2014 in a match against VVV-Venlo. He scored his first goal for the club on 6 February 2015 away against RKC Waalwijk, which ended in a 3–0 away win. Van der Sande scored the final goal in the match, after an assist from Alexander Mols. Van der Sande signed a contract extension with FC Den Bosch in March 2017, which would keep him at the club until 30 June 2019. He finished his stint with FC Den Bosch with 104 league appearances in which he scored 21 goals and made 11 assists. He also appeared for the reserve team, Jong FC Den Bosch, playing in the Derde Divisie and Hoofdklasse.

FC Eindhoven
On 17 June 2019, Van der Sande moved to FC Eindhoven as a free agent, signing a three-year contract with the Eerste Divisie side. He made his debut on 9 August in a 2–1 away win over NEC. Shortly after arriving, on 21 August 2019, he suffered a metatarsal fracture, sidelining him for at least three months. Van der Sande scored his first goal for the club on 17 December 2019 in a 2–0 away win over Excelsior in the KNVB Cup. 

Van der Sande had a strong 2021–22 season, scoring 13 goals in 39 appearances. He contributed as Eindhoven qualified for promotion play-offs, where they were, however, knocked out by ADO Den Haag in the semi-finals.

NAC Breda
On 25 April 2022, Van der Sande signed a two-year contract with NAC Breda with an option for an additional year.

Career statistics

References

External links
 

Living people
1996 births
Sportspeople from 's-Hertogenbosch
Footballers from North Brabant
Dutch footballers
Association football forwards
FC Den Bosch players
FC Eindhoven players
NAC Breda players
Eerste Divisie players
Derde Divisie players
Vierde Divisie players